Károly Telepy (Debrecen 1828 - Budapest 1906) was a Hungarian artist with works in the collection of the Hungarian National Gallery.

References

Hungarian artists
1828 births
1906 deaths